Shagufta Ejaz,born 5 May 1971, is a Pakistani actress, working in the Urdu television and film industry. She was born in Kunjah, a small town in District Gujrat, Punjab, Pakistan. She appeared in PTV Home's classic serials in 1990's.She is considered among the finest actors of Pakistan. She also appeared in few Punjabi films.

Career 
Ejaz started her career in showbiz industry in late 1980s, debut with Jangloos in 1989. She has been working with the PTV for a long time. Currently she is being seen at different TV channels in different drama serials. She won the 'Best Supporting Actress' for her role in Mere Qatil Mere Dildar at the Hum Awards. In 2013, she found the beauty salon, Envy by Shagufta Ejaz in Karachi. In 2022, Ejaz walked as one of the show-stoppers in the Mehndi segment during Kashee's Beauty Salon's 'Bridal Festive 2022' in Karachi.

Family 
Shagufta Ejaz is married to Yahya Siddiqi and has four daughters named as Anya Ali Siddiqui, Eman Ali Siddiqui, Haya Ali Siddiqui and Nabiha Ali 
1 son Hassan Ali
 Siddiqui.

Filmography

Film

Television

Awards and nominations

References

External links 
 
 Profile: Shagufta Ejaz

1971 births
Living people
People from Gujrat District
Punjabi people
Actresses from Karachi
Pakistani television actresses
Hum Award winners
20th-century Pakistani actresses
21st-century Pakistani actresses